The 1979–80 Football League season was Birmingham City Football Club's 77th in the Football League and their 32nd in the Second Division, to which they were relegated in 1978–79. They finished in third position in the 22-team division, level on points with Chelsea but with a better goal difference, so were promoted to the First Division for 1980–81. They entered the 1979–80 FA Cup in the third round proper and lost to Tottenham Hotspur in the fifth, and were eliminated from the third round of the League Cup by Exeter City. They also entered the Anglo-Scottish Cup, but failed to progress past the group stage.

Twenty-one players made at least one appearance in nationally organised first-team competition, and there were eleven different goalscorers. Midfielder Alan Curbishley appeared in all 51 first-team games of the season – defender Joe Gallagher missed only one – and Keith Bertschin was the club's top scorer with 18 goals, of which 12 were scored in the league.

Football League Second Division

The league programme did not end on the same day for all clubs. Although Birmingham were in second place after their last match, on 3 May, the last Second Division fixture was played nine days later, they were overtaken by Sunderland, and finished third.

League table (part)

FA Cup

League Cup

Anglo-Scottish Cup

Appearances and goals

Numbers in parentheses denote appearances as substitute.
Players with names in italics and marked * were on loan from another club for the whole of their season with Birmingham.

See also
Birmingham City F.C. seasons

References
General
 
 
 Source for match dates and results: 
 Source for lineups, appearances, goalscorers and attendances: Matthews (2010), Complete Record, pp. 394–95.
 Source for Anglo-Scottish Cup attendances: Matthews (1995), Complete Record, p. 243.

Specific

Birmingham City F.C. seasons
Birmingham City